Ditrigona obliquilinea is a moth in the family Drepanidae. It was described by George Hampson in 1892. It is found in Myanmar, India and China.

The wingspan is 13–20 mm for males and 14-20.5 mm for females. The costa of the forewings is pale buff, turning to dark grey basally. There are five grey fasciae, the proximal pair cross the distal end of the cell, the distal pair pass from near the apex to about three-fourths the distance from the base along the anal margin and there is a simple subterminal fascia. The hindwings have the fasciae continuous with those of the forewings.

Subspecies
Ditrigona obliquilinea obliquilinea (Burma, India: Assam, Sikkim, Darjeeling)
Ditrigona obliquilinea thibetaria Poujade, 1895 (China)

References

Moths described in 1892
Drepaninae
Moths of Asia